In to the Mix is a various artists compilation album released on June 10, 1997 by Hypnotic Records.

Reception

AllMusic gave In to the Mix a two and a half out of five possible stars.

Track listing

Personnel
Adapted from the In to the Mix liner notes.

 Eunah Lee – cover art, illustrations, design

Release history

References

External links 
 

1997 compilation albums
Hypnotic Records compilation albums